Redut (Russian: ЧВК «Редут»), also known as Redut-Antiterror or Centre R, is a Russian Private Military and Security Company (PMSC), part of the "Antiterror-family" which consists of similarly named PMSCs that protect commercial operations of civilian Russian companies, and is deployed by Russia in the Russian invasion of Ukraine.

It was established in 2008, as a merger of several smaller groupings by veterans of the Russian Foreign Intelligence Service, the Russian Air Force and units of the Russian Ministry of Defence (MoD), who had already gained experience in military and peacekeeping missions.

Organisation 
According to Norwegian researchers from the Forsvarets Forskningsinstitutt - FFI (Norwegian Defence Research Establishment), Redut-Antiterror emerged from the PMSC Antiterror-Orel, founded around 2003 by members of Russian Special Forces. It is an affiliate or branch
of the Antiterror-Orel offshoot Tiger Top Rent Security and is recruited predominantly from members of the Russian 45th Guards Special Reconnaissance Brigade. After sustaining heavy losses in the Kyiv Offensive, Redut contractors got invited to their base in Kubinka and offered contracts by the Russian MoD, to serve officially in the Russian Armed Forces. According to one of Redut's former commanders, Redut is under complete control of the Russian MoD.

Main backers of the company are said to be Oleg Deripaska and Gennady Timchenko, according to information provided by the website gulagu.net founded by Russian dissident Vladimir Osechkin, which cites a Redut deputy commander testifying under cover names. From them, the PMC received armored personnel carriers, helmets, and protective vests.

Deployment areas

Main areas 

 Ukraine: Redut-Antiterror was deployed in the Kyiv Offensive and took part in the Capture of Chernobyl. From there, they were ordered to operate covertly in the Kiev region in order to infiltrate and eliminate the political leadership and the Ukrainian Secret Service. Redut also took part in the Battle of Kharkiv, the Battle of the Siverskyi Donets and the Battle of Balakliia. As of mid-July 2022, two detachments of Redut, each counting 200 fighters, were operating in the Donbas region of Ukraine, both led by former Wagner Group commanders.

Former areas 
There are indications that the organisation provided military advisors and trainers for Abkhazian units in the Russo-Georgian War. It also saw action in Lebanon, Iraq, Syria, Somalia, Caribbean countries, the former Yugoslavia, as well as Afghanistan and Indonesia. Its services included the deployment of snipers, pioneers and guards. Personnel have been deployed to protect convoys, military installations, oil production facility personnel and Russian diplomats. In order to establish itself in the Iraq environment, the company received direct support from the FSB (intelligence).

See also 

 List of private security and military companies
 Russian invasion of Ukraine 2022
 Patriot (PMC)
 Wagner Group

Literature 

 Tor Bukkvoll, Åse G. Østensen: Russian Use of Private Military and Security Companies-the implications for European and Norwegian Security, FFI-RAPPORT, Norwegian Defence Research Establishment, 11 September 2018, retrieved from researchgate.net on 18 September 2022.
 Tor Bukkvoll, Åse G. Østensen: The Emergence of Russian Private Military Companies: A New Tool of Clandestine Warfare, Norwegian Defence Research Establishment, DOI:10.1080/23296151.2020.1740528, 2020

External links 

 Putin's Invisible Army, Grzegorz Kuczyński, Warsaw Institute, 30 March 2018.
 Analysis: Russian PMCs in the Middle East and Africa, Felix Riefer, Bundeszentrale für politische Bildung, 8 February 2021, accessed 18 September 2022

References 

Russo-Georgian War
Private military contractors
Paramilitary organizations based in Russia
Russian mercenaries
Military units and formations of the 2022 Russian invasion of Ukraine